Karrabina is a genus of trees in the family Cunoniaceae. It is endemic to eastern Australia and includes two species: Karrabina benthamiana and Karrabina biagiana, previously placed in the genus Geissois.

References

 
Oxalidales genera